Airlines PNG Flight 4684 (CG4682/TOK4684) was a scheduled domestic passenger flight operated by Papua New Guinean airliner Airlines PNG, flying from Jacksons International Airport in Papua New Guinea's capital Port Moresby to Kokoda Airport in Oro Province, Papua New Guinea. On 11 August 2009, the aircraft operating the flight, a de Havilland Canada Twin Otter, crashed into a forest in Kokoda Valley, a popular trekking site in Papua New Guinea, while carrying 13 people in bad weather. A search and rescue operation was conducted by authorities and found the wreckage of the crashed plane on the next day, 12 August 2009. The aircraft was severely damaged, and searchers found no signs of life. Papua New Guinean Search and Rescue Agency then announced that everyone on board was killed instantly in the crash.

The Accident Investigation Commission (AIC) investigated the cause of the crash and released its final report, concluding that the plane crashed due to pilot error. The plane deviated from its original flight path and the visual reference in Kokoda Gap was obscured by clouds, causing the pilots to not be aware of their proximity with the ground. The AIC classified the accident as controlled flight into terrain.

Flight

The aircraft departed Jacksons International Airport at 10:50 am local time and reported to Jacksons Tower that they were climbing for 9,000 ft to Kokoda via the Kokoda Gap, with an estimated time of arrival at 11:20 am. At 11:11 am, while en route to Kokoda and on descent in Kokoda Gap, the crew of Flight 4684 conversed with the crew of an aircraft, registered P2-KST, which was departing from Kokoda. There was no indication that the crew of Flight 4684 had any problems with their aircraft. Inside the ATC recording, the crew was heard saying "Thank you very much, morning long you". This was the last communication of Flight 4684.

Witnesses at Isurava village stated that they observed an aircraft fly low over the village at about the estimated time of the accident. Witnesses at the nearby Misima village stated that they heard an aircraft fly near their village but that they could not see the aircraft, as the area was covered by cloud. They reported that shortly after, there was a loud bang above their village and the sound of the aircraft stopped. Port Moresby ATC then lost contact with Flight 4684.

Port Moresby ATC then tried to contact Flight 4684, even requesting nearby aircraft in the area to contact the plane. However, there were no response from Flight 4684. They then asked to P2-MCD, an Airlines PNG plane departing from Efogi, if Flight 4684 had landed in Kokoda. The crews of P2-MCD then stated that P2-MCB did not land in Kokoda. Port Moresby ATC then declared Flight 4684 status to ALERFA (alert search and rescue phase), and then subsequently to DISTRESFA (distress search and rescue phase).

Search and rescue team scoured the area where Flight 4684 had lost contact. But the search and rescue operation was hampered by bad weather, low visibility and rough terrain. On 12 August 2009, a search and rescue team Dornier plane detected an ELT signal in the search area. Later on, a search and rescue team found the wreckage of Flight 4684. The aircraft was totally destroyed. The search team did not detect any signs of life in the crash site, and announced that no one survived the crash.

Aircraft
The aircraft involved in the accident was a De Havilland Canada Twin Otter, registered in Papua New Guinea as P2-MCB. It had a serial number of PCE-PG0073. The aircraft was configured to carry 19 passengers and two crew, and had a maximum take-off weight of 5,670 kg. The aircraft was fitted with the required equipment for two-pilot IFR flight, but an autopilot system was not fitted in the aircraft. The aircraft had accumulated a total flying time of 46,700 hours.

Passengers
The aircraft was carrying 11 passengers and 2 crew. The passengers included eight Australian tourists on their way to trek the Kokoda Track, two tour guides (one Australian and one Papua New Guinean) from No Roads Expeditions tour company, and a Japanese tourist. Seven of the nine Australian passengers on board came from Victoria, and two from Queensland. Aboard the flight was part-time tour guide Matthew Leonard, who was the son of Western Australia police inspector Bill Leonard.

The Captain was Jannie Moala from Papua New Guinea. She had accumulated 2,177 flying hours, of which 1,836 of them were on the Twin Otter. AIC found no evidence that she had been trained by Airlines PNG for Global Positioning System (GPS). However, training records that were provided by the operator showed that items identified within the operator's training syllabus that included the introduction to, and use of the GPS for en route navigation had been marked by the training captain as complete. No evidence as to the extent of that training, or level of understanding attained by Moala, was provided by the operator. The operator stated that at about the time of the accident, a GPS training package specific to the conduct of GPS non-precision approaches was being introduced.

The co-pilot was First Officer Rodney Souka from Papua New Guinea. He had accumulated 2,150 flying hours, of which 1,940 were on the Twin Otter. AIC did not find any evidence that Souka had been trained by Airlines PNG for Global Positioning System (GPS) of the aircraft.

Investigation

The accident was investigated by the Accident Investigation Commission (AIC), assisted by the Australian Transport Safety Bureau (ATSB). The AIC could only determine the cause of the crash without access to a CVR or FDR, as both flight recorders were not mandatory to be equipped on a Twin Otter. The lack of both flight data and cockpit voice recorders adversely affected a full understanding of the accident by the investigation.

The weather in Kokoda Gap at the time was poor. Based on eyewitnesses accounts and photographic evidence retrieved by ATSB, Kokoda Gap was obscured by clouds at the time of the accident, making it difficult for the pilots to know if they were in close proximity with the ground. Given the surrounding mountainous terrain, the evident cloud in the Kokoda Gap, as in this instance, had the potential to severely limit the crew's escape options, increase their workload, and test their situational awareness. A reduction in situational awareness and the presence of mountainous terrain during an approach are known risk factors in instances of controlled flight into terrain (CFIT).

Later investigation found that only one pilot had an IFR rating, while the other did not. The co-pilot, First Officer Rodney Souka, had been assessed for instrument approach procedures; however, he was not qualified for flight under the IFR. Although the crew had planned to fly under the IFR with visual procedures, the forecast cloud in the area ought to have alerted them that, under those procedures, visual flight in the Kokoda Gap could prove problematic. The visual descent into the Kokoda Gap required 5 km visibility, while at the time of the accident, the visibility was less than 5 km.

The Australian ATSB then turned their attentions to Souka. They examined his postmortem and medical history. Investigators found that Souka had critical coronary artery heart disease, and the examining pathologist considered that Souka could have had a medical emergency at any time. Souka's relatives reported that they were not aware of any significant medical condition affecting him. If an emergency occurred in mid-air as the aircraft approached the cloud to the north of the Kokoda Gap would have instantly increased Moala's workload and distracted her from the primary task of flying the aircraft. Both those factors are known to increase the risk of CFIT.

Investigators noted that Kokoda Airport was lacking with its navigation infrastructure. The lack of ground-based navigation aids at Kokoda Airport meant that the only potential navigation assistance for the crew during their approach to Kokoda was from the GPS, or via the ground-based non-directional beacon/distance measuring equipment (NDB/DME) located at Girua.

The investigation concluded that the accident was probably a controlled flight into terrain: that is, an otherwise airworthy aircraft was unintentionally flown into terrain, with little or no awareness by the crew of the impending collision.

See also

 Air New Zealand Flight 901
 Trigana Air Service Flight 267

References

External links
Airlines PNG
No Roads Expeditions
Papua New Guinea Accident Investigation Commission
Preliminary Report (Archive)
Aircraft Accident Investigation Interim Report (Archive)
Media Release ATSB 18 September 2009 (Archive)
Media Release 9 August 2010 (Archive)
Media Release 21 December 2010 (Archive)
Final Accident Report Summary by the Australian Transport Safety Bureau (Archive)
 Final report document (Archive)
Aviation Safety Network – accident description

Aviation accidents and incidents in 2009
Aviation accidents and incidents in Papua New Guinea
Accidents and incidents involving the de Havilland Canada DHC-6 Twin Otter
2009 in Papua New Guinea
Airliner accidents and incidents involving controlled flight into terrain
Airliner accidents and incidents caused by pilot error
August 2009 events in Oceania
2009 disasters in Papua New Guinea